is a Japanese tarento, actress, and writer. She is a former member of the Japanese idol group Nogizaka46, co-author of the self-help book Investment Methods that Keep My Money Growing Even Though I'm An Idol, and author of the novel Trapezium.

Early life
Takayama was born on February 8, 1994, in Minamibōsō, Chiba Prefecture. She attended a small school in which she had the same classmates for many years, and she trained in kendo throughout elementary school and junior high school.

Career

Nogizaka46
Takayama's entertainment career began in 2011 when she successfully auditioned for the first generation of the idol group Nogizaka46. Beginning with the group's first release, Takayama was regularly selected as one of the main recording and performing members on Nogizaka46 singles. She also performed on B-sides, including a 2012 acoustic duet with Mai Shiraishi, titled "Shibuya Blues", on Nogizaka46's fifth single "Seifuku no Mannequin". Takayama performed as part of the main selection group on every Nogizaka46 single released during her tenure. In 2016, her first solo photobook, titled , was published. The photos in the book were taken on location in her hometown of Minamibōsō. Her second photobook, with photos taken in Helsinki, was published in 2019. In the Oricon weekly book sales ranking for its first week of publication, Monologue placed first in the photobook category. Takayama made her final appearance as a member of the group in their November 2021 concert at Tokyo Dome, and wrote a short story titled The Name of Hope that was distributed to concert attendees.

Writing
Takayama made her literary debut in January 2016 with the short story , which was published on the website of Japanese magazine Da Vinci and illustrated by fellow Nogizaka46 member Mai Fukagawa. The next year she worked with Japanese investor Taizen Okuyama to learn about investing and track her own progress as an investor, which she and Okuyama then wrote about in a book published by PHP titled .

From May 2016 to September 2018, Takayama wrote a serialized novel titled  that was published in installments in Da Vinci. Trapezium tells the story of a young girl who has to make difficult choices to realize her dream of becoming an idol. The novel was published in a single volume in November 2018 by Kadokawa Shoten. In December 2018 the novel placed first in the Oricon book ranking in the literary category. The publisher had to stop reprinting the book after the fourth printing, as inventory of the special paper used for the book's cover ran out. A limited edition of the book with a wrapper containing commentary from fellow Nogizaka46 member Nanase Nishino was subsequently published.

Acting
As a Nogizaka46 member, Takayama took on acting roles in the television adaptation of the manga Bad Boys, the baseball drama Hatsumori Bemars, and the NHK taiga drama Hana Moyu, as well as appearing in advertising campaigns for the Tourism Authority of Thailand, Meiji Dairies, and travel company Jalan. As an individual performer she appeared on several television variety shows, and co-hosted the TBS program All Star After Party. A year after leaving the group, she joined the cast of the 2023 NHK series Chou Ningen Yousai Hiroshi Senki (lit. The War Chronicles of Superhuman Fortress Hiroshi) in the role of Akemi Bardot, marking Takayama's first lead acting role.

Selected works

Television

Books
 (co-author, with Taizen Okuyama) , PHP, 2017, 
 , Kadokawa Shoten, 2018,

Photobooks
 , Gakken Plus, 2016, 
 , Tokuma Shoten, 2019,

References

Living people
1994 births
People from Minamibōsō
Japanese idols
Japanese women singers
Japanese television actresses
Nogizaka46 members
21st-century Japanese novelists
21st-century Japanese women writers
People from Chiba Prefecture